Buin may refer to:

 Buin, Chile
 Buin, Iran (disambiguation)
 Buin, Papua New Guinea on Bougainville Island
 Buin Rural LLG on Bougainville Island

See also
 Bouin (disambiguation)